Sound of My Dream is a Chinese music program. It aired on Zhejiang Satellite TV for three seasons starting November 4, 2016.

Summary
Created by Zhejiang Satellite TV, top singers and amateur singers give mutual advice to each other on how to do their best to show the essence of music. The show consists of a host, celebrity judges/tutors and other music industry experts panelists. While every season the details have changed, the foundational premise remains the same. Every episode a number of talented singers, amateur or otherwise, perform in front of the audience and judges to showcase their talent. Then they are given the chance to "challenge" a celebrity tutor by singing one of the celebrity's songs. In exchange, the celebrity is assigned one of four randomly selected songs and has three hours to come up with a cover performance of this song. Contestant and celebrity then perform after three hours their respective covers, and the expert panelists judge whether the contestant has "defeated" the celebrity with their performance. Categories include singing ability, emotion/performance, musicality, etc. If the contestant is judged to have defeated the celebrity in that round, they are allowed to challenge another celebrity. The goal is to challenge every celebrity singer and defeat them all. However, few contestants have made it past the first round, and only a handful have succeeded in making it to the third round. Prizes for the winners vary by season: Season One gave contestants a chance to perform at the end-of-season concert, while Season Two awarded contestants their own original song (to be composed by the expert panelists) for each celebrity they defeated. This show has made a number of contestants famous, as well as elevated the fame of the celebrity tutors, in particular JJ Lin. The performances and full episodes are uploaded to Zhejiang's YouTube channel: "ZJSTV Music Channel."

Seasons

References

External links
 

Chinese-language television shows
2010s Chinese television series
2016 Chinese television seasons
2017 Chinese television seasons
2018 Chinese television seasons
Chinese reality television series
Chinese music television series
Zhejiang Television original programming